Light is a surname of the English language.

Etymology
Coming from Middle English, there are several possible meanings.  From the Middle English lyght it means a happy, cheerful person.  The Old English leoht could be a person who is ‘bright’ or ‘cheerful’. 

The two forms of light - leoht and lioht had distinct meanings, but became mixed over time. The Middle English word lite, coming from Old English l¯t ‘little’, also became lyght.

Individuals
Light may refer to:
Alan Light (born c. 1966), US journalist and music reviewer
Alan L. Light (born 1953), founder of the Comics Buyer's Guide
Alex Light (born 1994), American football player
Bill Light and Billy Light - see William Light (disambiguation), several people:
Bill Light (Willam "Bill" C. Light, b. 1949), American farmer and politician
Billy Light (William Henry "Billy" Light, 1913–1993), English footballer
Danny Light (1948–2014), English footballer
Douglas Light (fl. 1990s–present), US author
Elisha Light (1873–1952), English cricketer
Enoch Light (1907–1978), US classical violinist and bandleader
Francis Light (1740–1794), founder of the British colony of Penang
George Thomas Light (1820–1896), organist and architect in South Australia
H. Wayne Light (born 1945), US academic and author
James Light (born c. 1803), English cricketer
James F. Light (1921–2002), US literature scholar and university VP & provost
Jay Light (musician) (fl. 1970s–present), US musician
Jay Owen Light (1941–2022), US academic and university dean
Jennifer S. Light (fl. 2000s), US academic and author
John Light (disambiguation), several people:
John Light (actor) (born 1973), English cinema, television and theatre actor
John H. Light, American lawyer, Connecticut politician and Attorney General
Judith Light (born 1949), US television actress
Kevin Light (born 1979), Canadian rower
Matt Light (born 1978), US football player
Paul Light (fl. 1980s–present), English academic and university chancellor
Richard Upjohn Light (1902–1994), US neurosurgeon, aviator, cinematographer, and president of the American Geographical Society
Timothy Light (born 1938), professor emeritus at Western Michigan University
Walter Light (1927–1979), US musician
Walter Frederick Light (1923–1996), Canadian businessman
William Light (disambiguation), several people, including
William Light (1786–1839), first Surveyor-General of South Australia
William Light (cricketer) (1878–1930), English cricketer
William Light (Kansas politician) 
William Sidney "Cap" Light (died 1893), Texas lawman
Zion Lights, British-Indian activist
Fictional People
Doctor Light (disambiguation), three comicbook characters

See also
Leicht (surname) (German)
Leight (surname) 
Licht (surname) (German)
Lite - variation of Lyte
Luce (name) (French)
Luci (Italian)
Luz (name) (Spanish and Portuguese)
Lyght, surname
Lyte (surname) (English)

References

English-language surnames